The River Og is a short river in Wiltshire, England.

It rises near the hamlet of Draycot Foliat, and flows south for about  through Ogbourne St George, Ogbourne St Andrew and Ogbourne Maizey to the eastern edge of Marlborough, where it joins the River Kennet.

The river flows through a gap in the Marlborough Downs which creates a natural transport route, now followed by the A346 and once used by the Midland and South Western Junction Railway.

The name is a back-formation from Ogbourne, which itself means Occa's stream.

References 

Rivers of Wiltshire
1Og